S is the fifth novel in the Ring series by Koji Suzuki. It served as the basis of the film Sadako 3D and Sadako 3D 2.

The novel was released in English on December 19, 2017 under the title S (Es). It was also released in French on April 10, 2014, and is sold under the title Sadako.

Plot 
25 years after the events of Spiral, Takanori Ando, graphic designer at Studio Oz, a CG production company, is dating high school teacher Akane Maruyama, who is pregnant with his child, planning to marry her soon to avoid exposing the fact that he impregnated her out of wedlock. Company president Yoneda gives Takanori a USB drive containing a suicide video that went viral a month ago, asking him to reconfigure it for a possible future project. Upon copying the video into his laptop, he realizes that the video changes slightly; the suicidal man's body is positioned in a lower position than the original, revealing his neck. When he asks Yoneda about the video's origin, Yoneda tells him that it was given to him by Kiyomi Sakata, producer of the latest film that Studio Oz is working on. Meanwhile, Akane feels stalked by a figure. During an encounter at the high school where she works, she faints and is taken to a hospital, where she briefly hallucinates meeting her deceased mother.

One day, Akane unwittingly spots the copy of the suicide video. Consoling her, Takanori discovers that the video has changed further; the body is lowered to the extent that the man's face and the noose are now visible. The man is revealed to be Seiji Kashiwada, a serial killer who was apprehended a decade ago for murdering four girls and executed a month ago. Akane admits that she was his potential fifth victim. Fearing that he is still hunting her, Takanori promises to keep track of her using a GPS. Analyzing the video, Takanori deduces the location where it was shot and heads there, finding out that the room is currently occupied by a man named Hiroyuki Niimura.

Takanori seeks the help of Tsuyoshi Kihara, who once researched the Kashiwada case. Kihara opines that Kashiwada was not truly guilty. Kihara spots that the room where the man was hanged contains a first edition copy of Ring, a book written by Kazuyuki Asakawa and published by his brother, Junichi, twenty five years ago. Kihara has crime scene photos of Kashiwada's house when he was apprehended, which contained seventeen copies of the same book, also first edition. Digging into the Ring case, Takanori is surprised that his father, Mitsuo, who now heads a private hospital, was involved. Mitsuo reveals the events that led to the propagation of the ring virus, but states that the virus is now extinct. Takanori suspects that Mitsuo is hiding something, especially after he gave an ambiguous answer about why the family registry mistakenly lists Takanori as being dead. Takanori deduces that he had died when he was three years old but somehow resurrected two years afterward.

Upon further research of the Ring case, Takanori realizes that he has met Kashiwada years ago, but he was known as Ryuji Takayama back then. Connecting the dots between the physical similarities of Kashiwada's victims, Kihara theorizes that the victims were all clones of Sadako Yamamura, originator of the ring virus. It is possible that Kashiwada is hunting Sadako clones and, if he continues to hunt Akane, means that she is also a Sadako clone. During the premiere of Studio Oz's latest film, Takanori learns that Sakata's maiden name is Niimura. Requesting his friend to hack into her emails, Takanori connects to the emails of Hiroyuki, who is revealed to be Sakata's son. Hiroyuki keeps photos of the girls Kashiwada supposedly murdered, plus Akane's. Takanori finally realizes that Kashiwada had been framed and Hiroyuki was the real serial killer.

The night after the information is found out, Takanori loses track of Akane's GPS. Just when he is about to go find her, the suicide video copy in his laptop turns on, only this time Seiji is not hanged. Seiji confirms that he is Ryuji, was the one who sent the video to Sakata, and recounts events surrounding the Ring virus. Akane arrives shortly, prompting Ryuji to reveal his secret: he fathered her with Masako Maruyama, the alias of the Sadako clone born from Mai Takano. As a result, Akane is not truly a clone, as she was conceived sexually, so could survive where the Sadako clones could not. Ryuji was the one who ended the ring virus for good; by stopping the film adaptation, destroying the first edition copies of Ring, and reprinting them with the cure formula, he managed to stop the virus from propagating. He relented to allow four Sadako clones to exist, but all of them ended up being murdered by Hiroyuki, a former student of his. Ryuji managed to save Akane, but in the process implicated the real Seiji Kashiwada, whom he impersonated and as a result was wrongly arrested and executed. Bidding farewell to them, Ryuji states that he will return to the "world where he came from".

The next day, Takanori receives news of Hiroyuki's suicide in a train station, though he has a feeling that Akane was involved. Months later, Takanori and Akane hold their wedding. As Akane heads to her high school free from having to hide her pregnancy, she hears some girls discussing a rumor about a cursed video, hinting that the curse is about to start again.

References

External links
 'S'
 Official product site

Japanese horror novels
The Ring (franchise)
Novels by Koji Suzuki
Vertical (publisher) titles
Japanese novels adapted into films